St. Francis Secondary School may refer to:

 St. Francis Secondary School (Sierra Leone), school in Sierra Leone
 St. Francis Secondary School (Ontario), school in St. Catharines, Ontario
 St. Francis Secondary School (Ghana), school in Ghana.